Shomi Kaiser (born 15 January) is a Bangladeshi actress and producer. As of 2020, she is serving as the managing director of Dhansiri Communications Ltd, an advertising and event management company.

Early life and family 

Kaiser was born to Shahidullah Kaiser and Panna Kaiser on 15 January. Shahidullah was a writer-novelist. Panna is a writer and a former member of the parliament. Kaiser has a younger brother Amitabh Kaiser. Former President of Bangladesh A. Q. M. Badruddoza Chowdhury's wife Maya is the sister of Panna. That makes Shomi and politician Mahi B. Chowdhury cousins.

Career 

In 1989, director Atiqul Haque Chowdhury was looking for a young girl who could speak the native Noakhali dialect for his play Keba Apon Keba Por. And that's how Kaiser got her first role in acting. Next she worked on three episode play Joto Durey Jai, based on a novel of Imdadul Haque Milon, directed by Abdullah al Mamun and got the break-through. She then moved on to act in Nakkhotrer Raat, Chhoto Chhoto Dheu, Sparsho, Ekjona, Ariyana, Akashey Anek Raat, Mukti, Antorey Nirantor, Swapno, Thikana and others.

Kaiser worked for Dhaka Theatre for 12 years. She played Haat Hodai with co-actor Shahiduzzaman Selim. She appeared in films including Hason Raja (2002) and Lalon (2004). She was featured in another film, Ekti Nadir Naam (2002), based on the biography of filmmaker Ritwik Ghatak.

Kaiser is also a producer. She owns Dhansiri Production since 1997. It produced Mukti and Antorey Nirantor. In November 2013 her firm, Dhanshiri Communication Limited, got license for a private radio channel named Radio Active.

In May 2017, Kaiser was elected as one of the directors of Federation of Bangladesh Chambers of Commerce and Industry (FBCCI).  In January 2018, she was elected as the president of e-Commerce Association (e-CAB). She was nominated in the election as a representative of the Sammilita Ganotantrik Parishad panel.

In November 2018, Kaiser applied for nomination for the Feni-3 constituency on behalf of Bangladesh Awami League party.

Personal life 

Kaiser has been married three times. Her first husband is Indian-Bengali film director Riingo Banerjee, whom she married in 1999 and divorced two years later. Her second husband is Mohammad A Arafat, a private university faculty member, whom she married in 2008 and divorced in 2015. Her third husband is Reza Amin, a businessman, whom she married in 2020.

Works
Telefilms
 Jatra Pother Golpo (2018)

Television plays
Londoni Koinya- The bride from London (2000)
Pratipaksha
Onumoti Prarthona (2015)

Television serials
Kon Kanoner Phul

References

External links
 

Living people
Year of birth missing (living people)
Place of birth missing (living people)
Bangladeshi female models
Bangladeshi film actresses
Bengali television actresses
Bangladeshi television actresses
Best TV Actress Meril-Prothom Alo Critics Choice Award winners
Best TV Actress Meril-Prothom Alo Award winners